Hells Gate State Park is a public recreation area located on the southern edge of Lewiston, Idaho, at the Snake River's downstream entrance to Hells Canyon, the deepest canyon in North America. The state park was created by the U.S. Army Corps of Engineers to mitigate the construction of the Lower Granite Dam; the Idaho Department of Parks and Recreation began leasing the site in 1973. The park's  offer trails for hiking, mountain biking, and horseback riding as well as opportunities for camping, picnicking, fishing, boating, swimming, and taking jet boat trips into the canyon.

See also

 List of Idaho state parks
 National Parks in Idaho

References

External links
Hells Gate State Park Idaho Parks and Recreation
Hells Gate State Park Map and Brochure Idaho Parks and Recreation
Hells Gate State Park U.S. Army Corps of Engineers

State parks of Idaho
Protected areas of Nez Perce County, Idaho
Protected areas established in 1973
1973 establishments in Idaho